Following are the results of the 1951 Class B football championship. FC MVO Moscow winning the championship.

Teams

Relegated teams
Six teams were relegated from the 1950 Soviet Class A (top tier).
 Dinamo Minsk (return after a six-year absence)
 Lokomotiv Moscow (return after a three-year absence)
 Neftianik Baku (return after a two-year absence)
 Torpedo Stalingrad (debut)
 Lokomotiv Kharkov (return after a two-year absence)
 Dinamo Yerevan

Promoted teams
No teams received direct promotion. Only three teams were promoted from republican competitions through last year post-season playoffs. One more was replaced, Lokomotiv for Krasnaya Zvezda.

Final standings

Relegation play-off
To the play-off qualified the champion of the 1951 Football Championship of the Ukrainian SSR and the worst Ukrainian team of masters of the 1951 Soviet Class B.

|}

Number of teams by republics

See also
 1951 Soviet Class A
 1951 Soviet Cup

References

 1951 at rsssf.com

1951
2
Soviet
Soviet